There have been several Canadian Pan Am Games:

 1967 Pan American Games in Winnipeg, Manitoba
 1999 Pan American Games in Winnipeg, Manitoba
 2015 Pan American Games in Toronto, Ontario
 2015 Parapan American Games in Toronto, Ontario
 Canada at the Pan American Games

See also
 Canadian olympics (disambiguation)
 Canadian paralympics (disambiguation)
 Canadian Commonwealth Games (disambiguation)